Recea is a commune in Maramureș County, Romania. It is composed of five villages: Bozânta Mică (Kisbozinta), Lăpușel (Hagymáslápos), Mocira (Láposhidegkút), Recea (Lénárdfalva), and Săsar (Zazár).

At the 2011 census, 94.5% of inhabitants were Romanians, 4.1% Hungarians, and 1.2% Roma.

References

Communes in Maramureș County